The miR-192 microRNA precursor (homologous to miR-215), is a short non-coding RNA
gene involved in gene regulation.
miR-192 and miR-215 have now been predicted or experimentally confirmed in mouse and human.

microRNAs are transcribed as ~70 nucleotide precursors and subsequently processed by the Dicer enzyme to give a ~22 nucleotide product.  In this case the mature sequence comes from the 5' arm of the precursor.  The mature products are thought to have
regulatory roles through complementarity to mRNA.

mir-192 and mir-215 are thought to be positive regulators of p53, a human tumour suppressor. They are also overexpressed in gastric cancer, and could be used as biomarkers or therapeutic targets. It has also been suggested that mir-192 could be used as a biomarker for drug-induced liver damage.

miR-215 and miR-192 are also both implicated in major depressive disorder. Small-RNA sequencing reveals upregulated expression for both miR-215 and miR-192 in the synaptosomes derived from the dorsolateral prefrontal cortex of MDD subjects.

References

External links 
 
 miRBase family MIPF0000063

MicroRNA